The 1956 NCAA Wrestling Championships were the 26th NCAA Wrestling Championships to be held. Oklahoma A&M in Stillwater, Oklahoma hosted the tournament at Gallagher Hall.

Oklahoma A&M took home the team championship with 65 points and having one individual champion.

Dan Hodge of Oklahoma was named the Most Outstanding Wrestler.

Team results

Individual finals

References 

NCAA Division I Wrestling Championship
Wrestling competitions in the United States
1956 in American sports
1956 in sports in Oklahoma